A regional Internet registry (RIR) is an organization that manages the allocation and registration of Internet number resources within a region of the world. Internet number resources include IP addresses and autonomous system (AS) numbers. 

The regional Internet registry system evolved, eventually dividing the responsibility for management to a registry for each of five regions of the world. The regional Internet registries are informally liaised through the unincorporated Number Resource Organization (NRO), which is a coordinating body to act on matters of global importance.

Five regional registries
 The African Network Information Centre (AFRINIC) serves Africa. 
 The American Registry for Internet Numbers (ARIN) serves Antarctica, Canada, parts of the Caribbean, and the United States.  
 The Asia-Pacific Network Information Centre (APNIC) serves East Asia, Oceania, South Asia, and Southeast Asia. 
 The Latin America and Caribbean Network Information Centre (LACNIC) serves most of the Caribbean and all of Latin America. 
 The Réseaux IP Européens Network Coordination Centre (RIPE NCC) serves Europe, Central Asia, Russia, and West Asia.

Internet Assigned Numbers Authority
Regional Internet registries are components of the Internet Number Registry System, which is described in IETF RFC 7020, where IETF stands for the Internet Engineering Task Force. The Internet Assigned Numbers Authority (IANA) delegates Internet resources to the RIRs who, in turn, follow their regional policies to delegate resources to their customers, which include Internet service providers and end-user organizations. Collectively, the RIRs participate in the Number Resource Organization (NRO), formed as a body to represent their collective interests, undertake joint activities, and coordinate their activities globally. The NRO has entered into an agreement with ICANN for the establishment of the Address Supporting Organisation (ASO), which undertakes coordination of global IP addressing policies within the ICANN framework.

Number Resource Organization
The Number Resource Organization (NRO) is an unincorporated organization uniting the five RIRs. It came into existence on October 24, 2003, when the four existing RIRs entered into a memorandum of understanding (MoU) in order to undertake joint activities, including joint technical projects and policy coordination. The youngest RIR, AFRINIC, joined in April 2005.

The NRO's main objectives are to:

 Protect the unallocated IP number resource pool.
 Promote and protect the bottom-up policy development process of the Internet.
 Serve as a focal point for the Internet community to provide input on the RIR system.

Local Internet registry
A local Internet registry (LIR) is an organization that has been allocated a block of IP addresses by a RIR, and that assigns most parts of this block to its own customers. Most LIRs are Internet service providers, enterprises, or academic institutions. Membership in a regional Internet registry is required to become a LIR.

See also
 Country code top-level domain
 Geolocation software
 Internet governance
 National Internet registry

References

Internet Assigned Numbers Authority
Internet Standards
Internet governance